John Nicol Crombie (11 August 1827–1878) was a New Zealand photographer and businessman. He was born in Glasgow, Lanarkshire, Scotland on 11 August 1827. Aiding his success and business was his constant advertising, describing himself as 'Photographer to his Excellency' and his studios as the 'Royal Photographic Gallery.'

Crombie emigrated to Melbourne, Australia in 1852. He was employed by the Meade Brothers in their photographic studio after failing to find employment as his chosen profession of engineering. After gaining experience there he moved to Auckland, New Zealand in 1855 where he opened his own photography studio. He ran a successful business and claimed he took over 1,000 portraits in both Auckland and Nelson in a two-year period.

References

1827 births
1878 deaths
New Zealand businesspeople
New Zealand photographers
Scottish emigrants to New Zealand
Photographers from Glasgow